Corcuera is a Spanish surname. Notable people with the surname include:

Álvaro Corcuera (1957–2014), Mexican Roman Catholic priest
Arturo Corcuera (1935–2017), Peruvian poet
José Luis Corcuera (born 1944), Spanish politician
Pío Corcuera (1921–2011), Argentine footballer

Spanish-language surnames